Ryo Takahashi may refer to:

, Japanese footballer
, Japanese footballer
, Japanese musician and composer